Novy Tumutuk (Yañı Tımıtıq) is a rural locality (a selo) in Kushtiryakovsky Selsoviet, Bakalinsky District, Bashkortostan, Russia. The population was 190 as of 2010. There are 3 streets.

Geography 
Novy Tumutuk is located 44 km southwest of Bakaly (the district's administrative centre) by road. Kushtiryakovo is the nearest rural locality.

References 

Rural localities in Bakalinsky District